Airport is an under construction O-Train rapid transit station. It will be located at the Ottawa Macdonald–Cartier International Airport in the south end of Ottawa. Estimated for completion in 2023, it will serve as the southern terminus of the three-stop Line 4. The airport is currently served by an OC Transpo bus stop.

Service

Route 97 is the only bus that services this stop. It is the southern terminus for this route. From Airport station, Route 97 continues northward and terminates at Hurdman station on the O-Train Confederation Line. After 2023, Route 97 service to/from this station will be replaced by Line 4 train service to/from Greenboro station. R4 service will replace the bus route if Line 4 is delayed or out of service during regular hours. This station along with Uplands station will receive new bus connections from Local Route 197 after the completion of Stage 2 LRT.

At Hurdman, trains travel west to downtown Ottawa and east to Tremblay station (adjacent to Via Rail Ottawa station) before ending at the Blair station terminus.

References

Railway stations scheduled to open in 2023
Line 4 (Ottawa) stations
Ottawa
Transitway (Ottawa) stations